David Flynn O'Donoghue (11 July 1885 – 25 August 1960) was an Australian rules footballer who played with Collingwood in the Victorian Football League (VFL).

Notes

External links 

Dave O'Donoghue's profile at Collingwood Forever

1885 births
1960 deaths
Australian rules footballers from Geelong
Collingwood Football Club players
Northcote Football Club players